Military dependents' villages are communities in Taiwan built in the late 1940s and the 1950s whose original purpose was to serve as provisional housing for soldiers, sailors, airmen and marines of the Republic of China Armed Forces, along with their dependents from mainland China after the Government of the Republic of China (ROC) and the Kuomintang (KMT) retreated to Taiwan in 1949. They ended up becoming permanent settlements, forming distinct cultures as enclaves of mainlanders in Taiwanese cities. Over the years, many military dependents' villages have suffered from urban problems such as housing dereliction, abandonment, urban decay, and urban slum.

The houses in these villages were often haphazardly and poorly constructed, having been built hastily and with limited funding. The residents had no private land ownership rights for the houses they lived in, as the land was government property.

Following the passage of the Act for Rebuilding Old Quarters for Military Dependents in 1996, the government began an aggressive program of demolishing these villages and replacing them with highrises, giving the residents rights to live in the new apartments. As of 2019, there are less than 30 left out of an original number of 879, and some have been preserved as historic sites.

In a broad sense, the word can also mean the quarters for U.S. Military Advisory Group officers and their dependents in Taiwan.

Architecture

In the 1950s, most Dependents' Villages, except the legacy from the Japanese colonization, were built with minimal building standards on public land. The very common properties were built with straw-laid roof and mud-consolidated bamboo wall. It was only after the 1960s that the military reconstructed properties with bricks; and at the same time incorporated private toilets, bathrooms, kitchens, main pillars, roof tiles and electrical circuits into the properties. Till this, the properties of the Dependents Village had finally reached the same standards aligning with the rest of the architectures in Taiwan. By the end of the 1970s, Taiwan's property market was heated up with tremendous amount of newly built and renovated properties. However, due to housing ownership problems, houses in the Dependents Villages could not been rebuilt and replaced. Most of them suffered from outdated facilities and crowdedness. Each house had only 6–10 ping (1 ping ≈ 3.3 square metres) excluded the attached garden. Hence brick construction or reinforced brick-built, low level juàncūn properties had been comparatively derelict, especially within inner urban area.

Generally speaking, juàncūn from ten to hundreds of units tend to segregate themselves from the rest of the society. Although it tightened the relationship within the village, it had unavoidably prevented mingling and communications between the tenants and the rest of the communities outside.

Dependents' Villages is a unique cultural landscape that may soon pass into oblivion, as old soldiers pass away and urban renewal and redevelopment takes place. Also, out of patriotism and anti-Communism, residents of the military dependents' village, sharing the same professionalism, could usually build their own sense of community through frequent social networking.

In the early period, considering the sensitivity of soldiers' identity, the surrounding areas of military camps were heavily guarded, including the dependents' village; for the sake of clarification, relatives of soldiers had to present their resident permit in order to have access. Because the salary of soldiers was low at that time, the government provided educational assistance, medical treatment, and daily necessities like rice, flour, salad, and so forth, to supplement their living, which could be received only by showing a certain certificate as evidence. Mahjong is the most popular leisure activity. As the residents of the dependents' village all came from different provinces, along with them, they brought different tastes and regional wheaten foods, which contributed to the elaboration of Taiwanese wheaten food culture. Part of the slang used in military dependents' village later got integrated into the vocabularies of Taiwanese language.

Initially, none of the military families would have expected a permanent stalemate across the Taiwan straits. They either hoped to regroup, rearm, and then retake the mainland with US assistance, or feared that Communist armies would press on and take Taiwan too. In either case, the immediate impulse was to consider Taiwan as a temporary refuge for the medium-term.

Urban debates
Juàncūn is a burdened landscape inherited from the martial law era (1949–1987) in Taiwan. It has been seen as an unfair welfare provision that was predominately available to the Kuomintang (KMT) military and their families. The impact to the society in terms of social segregation and imbalance resource allocation has turn out to be more revolted than expected.

Juàncūn has now been the focus of dynamic architectural, political and cultural debate shaped by tensions between different collective memories as well as conflicting interests and visions of what the new urban landscape of 'new' Taiwan should be. G. Delanty and P. R. Jones's discourse (2002) about continuous debates and struggles as to which memories and symbols are to be preserved or destroyed from the urban landscape of the city can be clearly realized in the context of juàncūn and its preservation.

Popular culture
Due to a mix of the unique cultural and historical background of these villages, many creative works either feature life in the dependents' villages or are set in them as a background. Some notable examples are included as follows.

Film
 Papa, Can You Hear Me Sing, 1983.
 A Brighter Summer Day, directed by Edward Yang, 1991.
 Darkness and Light, directed by Chang Tso-chi, 1999.
 The Best of Times, directed by Chang Tso-chi, 2002.
 War Game 229, 2011.
 Four Hands, 2011.

Television series
 Story of Our Time, 2008.
 A Touch of Green, 2015.

Notable people from military dependents' villages

Film
 Ang Lee
 Hou Hsiao-hsien
 Doze Niu
 Edward Yang
 Brigitte Lin
 Sylvia Chang
 Joey Wong

Music
 Teresa Teng
 Chang Yu-sheng
 Pan An-bang
 Hou Dejian
 Richie Jen
 Tsai Chin (singer)
 Annie Yi

Television
 Blackie Chen
 Ethan Juan
 Frankie Kao

Literature
 Lung Ying-tai
 Chu T’ien-hsin
 Chu T’ien-wen
 Yuan Chiung-chiung
 Zhang Dachun

Politics
 James Soong
 Jason Hu
 John Chiang (Taiwan)
 Winston Chang
 Eric Chu
 Hau Lung-pin

Organized Crime
 Chen Chi-li
 Tung Kuei-sen

See also
Hsinchu Museum of Military Dependents Village
Red Envelope Club
Tiu Keng Leng
Treasure Hill

References

 G. Delanty and P. R. Jones, European Identity and Architecture. European Journal of Social Theory 5 (2002) 453–466.

Populated places in Taiwan
Residential buildings in Taiwan
Military history of Taiwan
Kuomintang